Kevin Jones (born January 10, 1964) is a Canadian international lawn bowler.

Bowls career
Jones won two bronze medals in the triples and fours respectively at the Asia Pacific Bowls Championships in 1987 and 1997.

He was selected to represent Canada at three Commonwealth Games; the 1994 Commonwealth Games, 1998 Commonwealth Games and the 2014 Commonwealth Games.

Family
His father is Ronnie Jones.

References

1964 births
Living people
Bowls players at the 1994 Commonwealth Games
Bowls players at the 1998 Commonwealth Games
Bowls players at the 2014 Commonwealth Games
Canadian male bowls players
Commonwealth Games competitors for Canada
Sportspeople from London, Ontario